Verónica Romero Sotoca (born 18 July 1978 in Elche, Spain), simply known as Veronica Romero, is a Spanish singer who rose to fame in 2001 after appearing on the reality singing contest Operación Triunfo, in which she finished in sixth place. Among the songs she performed on the program were "You'd Better Stop", "Un-break My Heart" ("Regresa a mí") and "One Day I'll Fly Away".

Serotonina
Serotonina was released 2 October 2006. This is Romero's first album with her own label, VK48 Music. She has moved from R&B, pop and jazz influences to pop-punk pop rock music, although she still performs her old hits in her live performances. The first single released from Serotonina was "Sería Imposible". Romero composed the song herself, and the video is scheduled to be recorded live at one of her performances in Madrid. The second single was a song about MSN Messenger entitled "Conectado a Mi". The music video for this single features Antonio López, a soccer player with Atlético Madrid.

Discography

Albums
2002 La Fuerza Del Sol
2003 Lluvia
2004 El Amor Brujo
2006 Serotonina
2009 EP Limited Edition

Singles
 2002: "Bésame"
 2002: "No Por él"
 2004: "No hay otro amor (No Other Love)"
 2004: "Tal Vez (So Long)"
 2004: "Magnético (Magnetic)"
 2006: "A 4 Ruedas" (promo)
 2006: "Sería Imposible"
 2007: "Conectado A Mi"
 2009: "Latidos"
 2009: "Hola Mundo"
 2010: "Un Corazón Más Roto"
 2011: "Contigo O Sin Ti" with Anand Bhatt

Filmography
 2003: "OT: La Película"
 2005: "Fín De Curso"
 2005: "Las Palabras De Vero"
 2006: "La Abuela"
 2008: "PUIU"
 2009: "El Excesivo Consumo de Estrógenos de Ludoviko Graham"

References

External links 
 Official website 

Living people
People from Elche
Spanish film actresses
Spanish women guitarists
Spanish rock singers
Singers from the Valencian Community
Spanish women pop singers
1978 births
Rock en Español musicians
Operación Triunfo contestants
21st-century Spanish singers
21st-century Spanish women singers
21st-century guitarists
21st-century women guitarists